Wendy Perron is an American dancer, choreographer, and teacher who was the editor-in-chief of Dance Magazine from 2004 to 2013. She is the author of Through the Eyes of a Dancer, Selected Writings, published by Wesleyan University Press in November 2013.

Biography
Perron graduated from Bennington College in 1969. She began her career in New York as a freelance dancer/choreographer at Dance Theater Workshop.  She danced with the Trisha Brown Dance Company (1975–78) and participated in one of Twyla Tharp's "farm clubs." Perron later noted: "From Trisha and Twyla, I learned you can use any kind of strange, jagged, weird movements and make a piece flow."

Perron has taught dance at Bennington College, Princeton University, NYU, Rutgers, and City College of New York . She also led the Wendy Perron Dance Company from 1983 to 1994 and was a Senior Fellow of The Vera List Center for Art and Politics at The New School. From 1992 to 1994 she was associate director of Jacob’s Pillow Dance Festival. She earned a master's degree from Empire State College in 2000.

Perron has written for The New York Times, The Village Voice, Ballet Review, and the Dance Research Journal. She joined the editorial staff of Dance Magazine in 2000 and became its editor-in-chief in 2004. In 2013 she became editor-at-large.

In April 2011, she was one of three artists inducted into New York Foundation for the Arts' inaugural Hall of Fame.

In 2017 she co-curated Radical Bodies: Anna Halprin, Simone Forti and Yvonne Rainer in California and New York, 1955–1973. She co-wrote and co-edited the book of the same title. She currently teaches a graduate seminar at NYU's Tisch School of the Arts.

See also
Black Swan dance double controversy

Notes

External links
Biography at Dance Magazine
Perron's Blog at Dance Magazine
Wendy Perron, Esteemed Editor-in-Chief of Dance Magazine, Recommends Swallow on Twitter!

Living people
American female dancers
American dancers
American dance critics
American choreographers
Bennington College alumni
Princeton University faculty
New York University faculty
Rutgers University faculty
City College of New York faculty
American women journalists
American women critics
Year of birth missing (living people)
American women academics
21st-century American women